Lawachara Jame Masjid is a mosque located in Bhanugach-Srimangal Road, Lawachara National Park, Kamalganj, Moulvibazar, Bangladesh.

History
The sidewall of the culvert next to the mosque crumpled up in May 2017, heavily affecting transportation. On 28 March 2018, the mosque's imam, Muhammad Mustafizur Rahman Masum of Gobindpur, went missing and could not be found at the mosque.

References

Kamalganj Upazila
Buildings and structures in Sylhet Division
Mosques in Bangladesh
Mosques completed in 1967